Mirninskoye Urban Settlement is the name of several municipal formations in Russia.

Modern urban settlements
Mirninskoye Urban Settlement, a municipal formation which the Urban-Type Settlement of Mirny in Orichevsky District of Kirov Oblast is incorporated as

Historical urban settlements
Mirninskoye Urban Settlement, a former municipal formation which the then-urban-type settlement of Mirny and three rural localities in Gordeyevsky District of Bryansk Oblast were incorporated as before being demoted in status to that of a rural settlement effective April 2011

See also
Mirninsky (disambiguation)
Mirny Urban Settlement

References

Notes

Sources

